Parazoanthus darwini is a species of macrocnemic zoanthid first found in the Galapagos. It can be distinguished by its association with sponges, by having about 24–30 tentacles and polyps embedded in a well-developed coenenchyme.

References

Further reading
Swain, Timothy D., and Laura M. Swain. "Molecular parataxonomy as taxon description: examples from recently named Zoanthidea (Cnidaria: Anthozoa) with revision based on serial histology of microanatomy." Zootaxa 3796.1 (2014): 81-107.
Low, Martyn EY, and James Davis Reimer. "Parazoanthus Haddon & Shackleton, 1891, and Parazoanthidae Delage & Hérouard, 1901: conservation of usage by Reversal of Precedence with Bergia Duchassing & Michelotti, 1860, and Bergiidae Verrill, 1869 (Cnidaria: Anthozoa: Hexacorallia)." Zootaxa 2995 (2011): 64-68.

External links

WORMS

Animals described in 2010
darwini